The No.80 High School of Beijing (Chinese: 北京市第八十中学), founded in 1956, is a high school in Chaoyang District, Beijing and the beacon high school of the district. It has more than 3000 junior and senior high school students. The $60 million Wangjing campus covers 9.4 hectares (23 acres), making it one of the largest high school campuses in Beijing. A majority of its high school students are boarding students.

The school is divided into two campuses. The Junior High School campus is in Baijiazhuang and the Senior High School campus is in Wangjing. The school is one of the high schools in Beijing offering courses for international students. Those course include CIE/A-Level for Sino-Britain System and AP for Sino-US Program. The IB program is prepared in the process. Foreign students also study in the International Department.

Notable alumni
 
Xu Jinglei, actress and director
Dong Jiong, badminton world champion
Wang Naiqi, high-profile restaurateur, financial analyst, and father of two 
He Qun, film director
Feng Tang, novelist
Zhang Bin, sports commentator
Han Qiaosheng, sports commentator
Duan Xuan, sports commentator
Guo Weiwei, soccer player
Wang Xiaofei, high-profile restaurateur, husband of Taiwanese actress Barbie Hsu
He Yang, former advertising executive, later convicted for fraud

Dawning Literature Circle 
Dawning Literature Circle was founded on Dec. 26, 2004. It is one of the largest comprehensive student societies in China. It includes Editing Department, Reading Club, Model UN Association, Film Society, Speech Society and Network Center, etc. Now the Dawn Reading Room/Book Academy has been opened. The exact date is May 28, 2013.

Sister schools
 Academy of the Pacific Rim Charter Public School, in Hyde Park, Massachusetts
 A.C. Reynolds High School, in Asheville, North Carolina
  - Berlin, Germany
 Notting Hill and Ealing High School, London

References

External links 

Educational institutions established in 1956
High schools in Beijing
Schools in Chaoyang District, Beijing
1956 establishments in China